The Sakhalin sole (Limanda sakhalinensis) is a flatfish of the family Pleuronectidae. Its native habitat is the polar waters of the northwestern Pacific, from the Sea of Okhotsk to the west and central Bering Sea, as far as the Pribilof Islands.

Description
The Sakhalin sole is elongate to oval in shape, with a small mouth and a convex space between the eyes. It has a uniformly medium to dark brown upper side and a white underside. Its fins are brown, and its lateral line has a high to medium arch over the pectoral fin. It is similar in appearance to the yellowfin sole and the rock sole.

Diet
The diet of the Sakhalin sole consists mainly of zoobenthos organisms, including polychaetes, amphipods, krill and other crustaceans.

References

Sakhalin sole
Fauna of Sakhalin
Sea of Okhotsk
Sakhalin sole